Santa Isabel (English: Saint Elizabeth) is a former parish (freguesia) in the municipality of Lisbon, Portugal. At the administrative reorganization of Lisbon on 8 December 2012 it became part of the parish Campo de Ourique. It was created on May 14, 1741, by Cardinal Tomás de Almeida.

Main sites
Pedro Álvares Cabral Statue
Condes de Anadia Palace

References 

Former parishes of Lisbon